Kengo (剣豪) is a series of video games developed by Genki.  Kengo is considered a spiritual successor to the Bushido Blade game series for the PlayStation.

Games

Kengo: Master of Bushido

Kengo 2: Legacy of the Blade
The second game in the Kengo series was released for the PlayStation 2 in Japan on June 27, 2002. It was released in Europe on February 14, 2003 under the title Sword of the Samurai. It features a character creation feature and over 100 detailed swords to choose from. Published by Ubisoft. It was not released in North America.

In Japan, Famitsu gave the sequel 30 out of 40. The game received a 64% overall review score from Futuregamez.

Kengo 3
The third game in the Kengo series was released for the PlayStation 2 on September 22, 2004. Featuring much improved graphics and a simplified fighting system from Kengo 2. It was released only in Japan.

Kengo: Legend of the 9
Released for the Xbox 360 on September 7, 2006, Kengo: Legend of the 9 (Kengo: Zero in Japan and Europe) was developed by Genki and published by Majesco Entertainment. It is the fourth and last game in the series.

In the game there are a total of 10 playable characters:
 Historical: Miyamoto Musashi, Yagyū Jūbei Mitsuyoshi, Chiba Sanako (famed female master swordsman born into a famous family of swordmaster in the Edo era), Itō Ittōsai, Okada Izō, Okita Sōji, Sasaki Kojirō, Sakamoto Ryōma, Horibe Yasubei. Jion (unlockable) Although thought to be a fictional character, Jion may in fact refer to Sōma Shiro Yoshimoto, also known as Jion, the founder of Nen-ryu.

Reception

Kengo: Legend of the 9 was panned by critics. The game received "unfavorable" reviews according to video game review aggregator Metacritic.

References

3D fighting games
Fighting games
Genki (company) games
Multiplayer video games
PlayStation 2 games
Video game franchises
Video game franchises introduced in 2000
Video games about samurai
Video games developed in Japan
Video games set in feudal Japan
Xbox 360 games